Sphaleromyces is a genus of fungi in the family Laboulbeniaceae. The genus contain 3 species.

References

External links
Sphaleromyces at Index Fungorum

Laboulbeniomycetes